Nicholas Perrin is an American academic administrator and religious scholar, currently serving as the 16th president of Trinity International University, a Christian university located in Deerfield, Illinois.

Early life and education 
Perrin earned a Bachelor of Arts in English literature from Johns Hopkins University and Master of Divinity from Covenant Theological Seminary. He then earned a Ph.D. in Biblical Studies from Marquette University.

Career 
Perrin previously served the Franklin S. Dyrness Professor of Biblical Studies at Wheaton College, Illinois. Where his work focused on the New Testament and early Christianity. Perrin has published on the Gospel of Thomas and proposed the theory that Thomas is dependent on  Tatian's Diatessaron.

In addition to his writings on Christian origins and the Gnostic Gospels, Perrin has authored a number of popular lay introductions to works such as the Gospel of Judas and Gospel of Thomas. In 2007 Lost in Transmission was published as a response to Bart Ehrman's popular Misquoting Jesus dealing with issues of textual criticism of the New Testament.

In 2008 Perrin delivered a public lecture on the historical Jesus at the University of Georgia.

Perrin was announced as the 16th president of Trinity International University in 2019, succeeding David Dockery.

Works

Books

As editor

Articles and chapters

Training course

References

External links
 
 An Interview with Nicholas Perrin on the Gospel of Thomas (1 of 3)

Living people
American biblical scholars
American theologians
Wheaton College (Illinois) faculty
Marquette University alumni
Johns Hopkins University alumni
Covenant Theological Seminary alumni
New Testament scholars
Year of birth missing (living people)